CLASS B1359+154 is a quasar, or quasi-stellar object, that has a redshift of 3.235. A group of three foreground galaxies at a redshift of about 1 are behaving as gravitational lenses. The result is a rare example of a sixfold multiply imaged quasar.

See also
 Twin Quasar
 Einstein Cross

References

External links
Simbad data on QSO B1359+154
 Image QSO B1359+154
 Six-Image CLASS Gravitational Lens
 SIMBAD data

Gravitationally lensed quasars
Gravitational lensing
Boötes